The 2012 Jiangsu Sainty season is Jiangu Sainty's 4th consecutive season in the Chinese Super League after promotion in the 2008 season. They also competed in the Chinese FA Cup that year, getting knocked out in that competition.

Players

First team squad
As of 30 October 2012

Reserve squad

Out on loan

Transfers

Winter

In:

Out:

Summer

In:

Out:

Competitions

Chinese Super League

League table

Matches

Chinese FA Cup

References

Jiangsu F.C. seasons
Jiangsu Sainty F.C.